The 1911 Canton Professionals season was their third season in the Ohio League, and their first since 1906. The team finished 8–1.

Schedule

Game notes

References

Canton Bulldogs seasons
Canton Bulldogs
Canton Bulldogs